SSB Ranidanga Stadium is a football stadium in Golaghat, Assam.

Owner
The stadium is owned by Sashastra Seema Bal.

I-League 2nd division
The stadium was one of the two venues for 2015 I-League 2nd Division.

References

Football venues in Assam
I-League 2nd Division venues
Year of establishment missing